Tillandsia xiphioides is a species in the genus Tillandsia. This species is native to Bolivia, Brazil, Paraguay, Uruguay, and Argentina.

Four infraspecific taxa are recognized:

Tillandsia xiphioides var. minor L.Hrom. - Argentina
Tillandsia xiphioides subsp. prolata H.E.Luther - Bolivia
Tillandsia xiphioides var. tafiensis L.B.Sm - Argentina
Tillandsia xiphioides subsp. xiphioides - most of species range

Cultivars
 Tillandsia 'Folly'
 Tillandsia 'Mystic Trumpet'
 Tillandsia 'Mystic Trumpet Peach'
 Tillandsia 'Mystic Trumpet Pink'

References

xiphioides
Flora of South America
Epiphytes
Plants described in 1816